Alma Delfina (née Martínez Ortega) is a Mexican actress.

Acting career
Sister of the director Gonzalo Martinez Ortega, writer Mario Iván Martínez and the actresses Socorro Bonilla and Evangelina Martínez. She is also the aunt of actors Roberto Sosa, Evangelina Sosa and Mario Iván Martínez.

Started her career in 1974 in the telenovela Mundo de juguete. In the 1970s she was active principally on movies. In the 1980s acted in soap operas like Guadalupe (1984), Vanessa (1982) with Lucía Méndez, Chispita (1983), Vivir un poco (1985) with Angelica Aragón and Marionetas (1987). In the 1990s starred Cañaveral de Pasiones (1996) and Pueblo chico, infierno grande with Verónica Castro in the role of the evil prostitute La Beltraneja. In 1999 she moved to the United States. Starred in TV series like ER and CSI: Miami (2002). In the 2005 she returns to Mexican telenovelas with her appearance in the Fonovideo/Televisa production Inocente de Ti. Throughout the 2000s, Delfina would appear in multiple productions for Fonovideo/Televisa (El Amor No Tiene Precio, Bajos Las Riendas Del Amor), Univision (Vidas Cruzadas, El Talisman, Cosita Linda), and Azteca (Vidas Robadas, Bajo El Alma). In 2016, Alma Delfina joined the cast of the NBC soap opera Days of Our Lives as Adriana Hernandez.

Filmography

Awards and nominations

External links

1960 births
Living people
Mexican telenovela actresses
Mexican television actresses
Mexican film actresses
20th-century Mexican actresses
21st-century Mexican actresses
Actresses from Chihuahua (state)
People from Camargo, Chihuahua